On the Edge of Peace is the first co-production joint Israeli and Palestinian . The documentary film captures a tumultuous year from the perspective of both sides. From the signing of the Oslo Accords to Yasser Arafat’s return to Gaza in 1994, three Palestinians and three Israelis are sent out with camcorders to document their own lives in intimate video diaries.

Summary
Juxtaposing media coverage of watershed events with the localized views of the diarists, the film shows the varied effects of politics on individuals’ lives. In refugee camps, kibbutz settlements and cities, we hear a variety of personal and emotional takes on life under the often-violent shadow of the peace process.

References

See also
Other Similar Israeli films:
The Land of the Settlers
My Dearest Enemy
All Hell Broke Loose
Reach for the Sky
The Temple Mount is Mine
The Skies are Closer in Homesh

External links
The Jewish Channel's review
The film's official website

Documentary films about the Israeli–Palestinian conflict
Israeli documentary films
Palestinian documentary films
1994 films
1994 documentary films
Yitzhak Rabin
Yasser Arafat